Kalecik Karası is a Turkish grape variety and a Turkish wine produced from this grape. This grape and wine are called by the name of area, the Kalecik district of Ankara Province, Turkey. Kalecik Karası grows successfully near Kalecik. In its homeland Kalecik, the microclimate created by Kızılırmak river and the soils rich in marine fossils offer optimum conditions to cultivate good quality Kalecik Karası.

Kalecik Karası grapes are known for their taste and aroma. In good vintages, wines made from Kalecik Karası has won several awards in International wine contests, and has attracted the interest of Turkish consumers. As a result, Kalecik Karası has become much in demand among domestic wines in recent years. The Kalecik Karası grape of Central Anatolia, which was on the brink of extinction due to long neglect, has taken its place in viticulture, thanks to the long-term efforts of Turkish and French experts and Ankara University Faculty of Agriculture. Because of high demand, this grape is now also cultivated in other parts of Turkey with similar climatic conditions, such as the high grounds of the Denizli region.

A typical Kalecik Karası wine has light to medium bodied, has the color of a ruby red, is rich, well-balanced, and has a lasting aroma of red fruit. It also has vanilla and cacao aromas when it is aged in oak. It has a light, fresh, and elegant finish. Generally, the wine has an alcohol ratio between 12 and 14%, and an acidity range of 4 to 7 grams/liter.

See also
 Boğazkere
 Çalkarası
 Öküzgözü
 Papazkarası

References

Grape varieties of Turkey
Ankara Province
Culture in Ankara
Economy of Ankara
Turkish words and phrases
Red wine grape varieties